Nanyang Basin is located in Henan Province of the People's Republic of China, a small part of the basin is in Hubei Province, the southern neighbor of Henan. Its total area is 46291 square kilometers.

Drainage basins of China
Landforms of Henan
Landforms of Hubei